II Army Corps (II. Armeekorps) was a corps in the German Army during World War II.

Organisation 
Organisation of the corps at different times included;

1939 (September) 

 Corps Staff and Headquarters
402nd Corps Signals Unit
42nd Corps Propaganda Battalion
 402nd Corps Supply Troops
 402nd Field Gendarmerie Troop
 3rd Infantry Division
 32nd Infantry Division
 2nd Artillery Command

1940 (May) 

 Corps Headquarters
 42nd Corps Signal Battalion
 402nd Corps Mapping Platoon
 402nd Courier Platoon
 402nd Field Post Platoon
 402nd Supply Battalion
 402nd Military Police Platoon
 1st Heavy Reconnaissance Flight, 11th Reconnaissance Squadron (attached from Luftwaffe)
 3rd Heavy Reconnaissance Flight, 21st Reconnaissance Squadron (attached from Luftwaffe)
 1st Battalion, 13th Anti-Aircraft Regiment (attached from Luftwaffe)
 86th Light Anti-Aircraft Battalion (attached from Luftwaffe)
 7th Panzer Division
 12th Infantry Division
 32nd Infantry Division
 263rd Infantry Division
 525th Heavy Anti-Tank Battalion
 2nd Artillery Command
 501st Artillery Headquarters
 32nd Artillery Survey Battalion
 2nd Battalion, 38th Heavy Artillery Regiment
 2nd Battalion, 39th Heavy Artillery Regiment
 436th Heavy Artillery Battalion
 45th Engineer Battalion
 45th Pontoon Engineer Column
 178th Pontoon Engineer Column
 1st Pontoon Engineer Column, 402nd Pontoon Regiment
 2nd Pontoon Engineer Column, 402nd Pontoon Regiment
 656th Pontoon Engineer Column
 580th Road Construction Battalion
 622nd Light Road Construction Battalion

1942 (June) 

 Corps Headquarters
 42nd Corps Signal Battalion
 402nd Corps Mapping Platoon
 402nd Field Post Platoon
 402nd Corps Supply Battalion
 402nd Military Police Platoon
 1st Battalion, 13th Anti-Aircraft Regiment (attached from Luftwaffe)
 92nd Light Anti-Aircraft Battalion(attached from Luftwaffe)
 5th Field Luftwaffe Defence Unit
 2nd Battalion, 3rd Luftwaffe Jäger Regiment
 3rd Battalion, 3rd Luftwaffe Jäger Regiment
 4th Battalion, 5th Luftwaffe Jäger Regiment
 12th Infantry Division
 30th Infantry Division
 32nd Infantry Division
 123rd Infantry Division
 290th Infantry Division
 SS Division Totenkopf

Commanders
Generalleutnant Fedor von Bock, creation – April 1935
General der Infanterie Johannes Blaskowitz, April 1935 – 10 November 1938
Generaloberst Adolf Strauß, 10 November 1938 – 30 May 1940
General der Infanterie Carl-Heinrich von Stülpnagel, 30 May 1940 – 21 June 1940
General der Infanterie Walter Graf von Brockdorff-Ahlefeldt, 21 June 1940 – May 1942
General der Panzertruppe Otto von Knobelsdorff, June 1942 – 1 July 1942
General der Infanterie Walter Graf von Brockdorff-Ahlefeldt, 1 July 1942 – 28 November 1942
General der Infanterie Paul Laux, 28 November 1943 – 1 April 1944
Generalleutnant Wilhelm Hasse, 1 April 1944 – 5 May 1944
Generalleutnant Kurt von Tippelskirch, 5 May 1944 – 11 May 1944
General der Infanterie Paul Laux, 11 May 1944 – 3 July 1944
General der Infanterie Wilhelm Hasse, 15 July 1944 – 15 January 1945
General der Infanterie Dr.Dr. Johannes Mayer, 15 January 1945 – 1 April 1945
Generalleutnant Alfred Gause 1 April 1945 – German capitulation

Area of operations
 Poland - September 1939 to May 1940
 France - May 1940 to June 1941
 Eastern Front, Northern Sector  - June 1941 to October 1944
 Courland Pocket - October 1944 to May 1945

See also
 List of German corps in World War II

References

External links
 

Army,02
Military units and formations established in 1935
Military units and formations disestablished in 1945